Final Exam is a 1981 American slasher film written and directed by Jimmy Huston, and starring Cecile Bagdadi, Joel S. Rice, and DeAnna Robbins. The plot follows a nameless killer stalking the remaining group of students left on a college campus days before the beginning of summer vacation.

Filmed in North Carolina and South Carolina with a cast of largely Los Angeles-based actors, Final Exam was released by Motion Picture Marketing in the winter of 1981. The film was met with a middling critical response, being both criticized and praised for similarities to Halloween (1978) and Friday the 13th (1980). The campus filming locations included Limestone University (Gaffney, South Carolina) and Gardner-Webb University (Boiling Springs, North Carolina).

While not prosecuted for obscenity, the film was seized and confiscated in the UK under Section 3 of the Obscene Publications Act 1959 during the video nasty panic. The film has received a modern reevaluation by critics for the arbitrary villain and its focus on character development rather than gore and shock value. The central male character in the film, Radish, served as partial inspiration for the character of Randy Meeks in Wes Craven's Scream (1996).

Plot
One night at March College, a young couple are making out in a parked vehicle. An unseen assailant harasses them before murdering them both.

Meanwhile the nearby Lanier College is preparing for its final exam date. In order to ensure a group of students ace their chemistry final, a fraternity fakes a shooting on campus so that the students can have more time to study. The prank works, resulting in a small number of students remaining on campus until the following day's final. Meanwhile, the murderer responsible for the March College killings arrives on campus in a van and begins stalking the remaining students.

Bookish Courtney is studying hard for her exams, while her wealthy roommate Lisa is preparing to leave for her home in New York City. Lisa is also having an affair with one of her professors, Dr. Reynolds. At nightfall, Gary, a pledge for Gamma Delta, suffers from a prank in which he is bound to a tree. The murderer unties him, before killing him with a knife. Gary's girlfriend, Janet, goes searching for him, and mistakes a silhouette in the distance for him. When she realizes it is not Gary, she attempts to flee, but is attacked by the killer and murdered.

Another Gamma member, Wildman, is lured into a darkened gymnasium while attempting to steal prescription drugs from the football coach's office. The murderer appears and chases Wildman to the weight room, where he is garroted on a weight-lifting machine. Another student named Mark discovers Wildman's body and is subsequently chased by the murderer into the school's electrical building. The murderer emerges from a barrel and stabs Mark, killing him. Nerdy student Radish discovers the carnage and attempts to alert the police, who do not take him seriously due to all the ongoing pranks. Radish goes to warn Courtney but finds the murderer in her room instead and is also killed.

Courtney returns to her dormitory, where she discovers Radish's body pinned to her door. A terrified Courtney attempts to alert her dormitory, but everyone has gone home for the break. Lisa waits for Dr. Reynolds in the school's conservatory but the murderer enters the room and stabs her to death. Courtney goes to the conservatory to alert Lisa, only to discover her body. The murderer chases after her, and Courtney arms herself with a kitchen knife, before taking refuge in the campus's clock tower. Alerted by Courtney's cries for help, a coach arrives and shoots an arrow at the murderer, but he catches it in his hand and impales the coach with it, killing him. The murderer attempts to finish Courtney off but she manages to push him from the top floor of the tower. Thinking him dead, Courtney is seized by the murderer when he grabs her ankle. She stabs him 12 times, ultimately killing him.

The film ends as Courtney sits on the front steps of the building and begins sobbing over the events that just took place.

Cast

Analysis
Todd Gilchrist of IGN notes elements of homoeroticism in the film, particularly its depiction of hazing rituals among the fraternity: "What's problematic about this kind of idiosyncratic behavior isn't that it's homoerotic, but that it doesn't mean anything in the movie and never connects to anything else that happens... Nerds, jocks, and nubile co-eds are all integral parts of the slasher-movie mythos, but none of those character types are used to any effect other than expanding the body count once the killings actually begin". Ian Jane of DVD Talk makes a similar observation of the film in a retrospective review.

Production
The majority of the cast on Final Exam were stage actors cast in Los Angeles, California. The film's lead, Cecile Bagdadi, was cast after she was seen performing in a production of Faces on the Wall at the Coronet Theatre in Los Angeles. The film was shot over a period of six weeks from September 15, 1980 to October 25, 1980 at E.O. Studios in Shelby, North Carolina. Additional photography took place at Limestone College in Gaffney, South Carolina, and Isothermal Community College in Spindale, North Carolina. The film's budget was approximately $363,000.

Release

Box office
Final Exam received a limited regional release on February 27, 1981, screening in St. Louis, Missouri and Dayton, Ohio. It continued to screen regionally throughout the spring before having its Los Angeles premiere on June 5.

The film was a minor commercial success, grossing $1.3 million in the United States. Per a June 26 report from Variety, the film was ranked number 7 at the U.S. box office at that date.

Critical response 
Hal Lipper of Dayton Daily News compared the film positively to Halloween (1978) stating that he found the film to be "slicker" and "better acted" than the latter but less scary due to the killer frequently being shown. Lipper also went on to praise the camerawork: "A welcome addition to Final Exam, however is its competent camerawork. It's a polished, professional effort that bellies its $363,000 budget, although a couple of hand-held camera shots at the film's finale might have heightened its impact". He then wrote that the performances of Bagdadi and Rice were highlights of the film. Linda Gross of The Los Angeles Times gave the film a middling review, noting that it "vacillate[s] between the college-prank humor of an Animal House and a killer-thriller like Prom Night". Gene Siskel of the Chicago Tribune deemed the film a "rip-off" of Halloween (1978), characterized by "standard stalking-shots as the camera rolls in on the girls as they cower in terror in hallways and classrooms". TV Guide called the film "dull" and "virtually bloodless", panning the film's dialogue heavy scenes. The Baltimore Evening Suns Lou Cedrone panned the film, writing: "The script never explains who the murderer is or why he's doing the killing...  The most horrifying thing about it is the behavior of the fraternity boys, and the only really commendable thing about it is that the killings are handled with restraint".

The Courier-Journals Gregg Swem noted that the film "reeks of cheapness", with "childish" dialogue, though he conceded that the film "succeeds at scaring. There are some suspenseful moments that linger mercilessly".

Modern assessment
AllMovie called it "a hybrid of frat-boy comedy and slasher-thriller exploitation which features no slashing, no humor and fails to exploit anything". Brett Gallman from horror review website Oh, the Horror! gave the film a positive review. Complimenting the film's characterizations, and slow mounting tension while also criticizing the murders as uninventive and long stretch before the murders occur.

In Legacy of Blood: A Comprehensive Guide to Slasher Movies, film scholar Jim Harper notes that the film takes "the autonomous face of the slasher movie killer to the extreme: the man terrorizing the teenagers is shown on screen, but he has no name, no connection to his victims, no history is ever given, nor any motive. He simply appears, begins killing, and is defeated". He also notes the film's shortcomings in character development, writing: "If the rest of the characters had been as well drawn as Radish, then Final Exam might well have been a minor classic. As it is, they're all stereotypical jocks and cheerleaders, and ultimately forgettable".

On Rotten Tomatoes the film has an approval rating of 13% based on reviews from 8 critics, with an average rating of 3.5/10.

Home media
The film was first released on DVD by BCI on September 23, 2008 and was later released by Scorpion Releasing on September 20, 2011. The film was released for the first time on Blu-ray by Shout Factory on May 13, 2014.

Musical score

An official score was released for the film in 1981 by AEI Records.

Track listing

Novelization
A mass market paperback novelization of the same name, written by Geoffrey Meyer, was published by Pinnacle Books in 1981. It later went out of print. The novelization further expands on the development of the characters, including the couple who are murdered at the beginning of the film. While the couple are nameless in the film, this adaptation reveals their names to be Dana and John and provides them with a backstory. Additionally, the novelization hints at the motivation of the killer which is never explained in the film.

See also
 List of American films of 1981
 List of horror films set in academic institutions
Halloween
Final Examination, a 2003 horror film with a similar title

References

Sources

External links
 
 
 
 Original theatrical trailer on YouTube

1981 films
1981 horror films
1980s horror thriller films
1981 independent films
1980s mystery films
1980s serial killer films
1980s slasher films
1980s teen horror films
American slasher films
Embassy Pictures films
Films about pranks
Films about stalking
Films set in universities and colleges
Films set in North Carolina
Films shot in North Carolina
Films shot in South Carolina
American serial killer films
Video nasties
American exploitation films
American splatter films
1980s English-language films
1980s American films